AlTibbi (Arabic: الطبي) is a digital health platform in the Middle East and North Africa (MENA). Launched by both Jalil Labadi and his father, Dr. Abdel Aziz Labadi, in 2008 in Amman, Jordan. The platform aims to present reliable, up-to-date and simplified medical information to users in the region in Arabic, according to their proclaimed mission. Today, the website features thousands of medical articles, a medical glossary, a section that is dedicated to questions and answers, the latest news in medicine, telehealth services and consultations and a lot more. AlTibbi has also partnered with Mawdoo3, a leading online Arabic content provider, to provide high quality content to a growing audience in the region.

Background 
Upon his return from Germany in 2004, Dr. Abdel Aziz Labadi launched the “Medical Glossary” in Arabic, creating a pioneering medical reference for Arabic-speakers. In 2008, Jalil Labadi sought to build on his father's glossary, and create a more comprehensive platform, targeting all Arabic-speakers in the MENA region who were, according to his observations, in need of reliable information in their mother-tongue. Ever since its inception in 2008 in Amman, Jordan, Altibbi has expanded and become one of the leading health platforms in the region:

 In 2010, the medical glossary was further developed and turned into a multi-service medical website, with the aim of reaching as many users as possible.
 In 2012, the website received text questions from patients and provided answers from specialized doctors for free.
 In 2016, remote consultation services were activated, and users could, for the first time, contact doctors at any place and time via the internet or telephone.
 In 2019, the platform enabled doctors to activate the e-clinic, a patient management system where they could manage patients’ files, appointments, bookings, and electronic health records online and launched services globally.

Funding 
When it was first launched in 2008, the founders relied on self-funding, and the financial support of friends and relatives. The website received its first investment in 2015 from Middle East Venture Partners and DASH ventures.

With this investment, Altibbi was able to enhance interaction between doctors and users, and draw a larger number of doctors and users from five Arab countries: Saudi Arabia, UAE, Kuwait, Jordan, and Lebanon.

In 2018, Altibbi received a new round of funding, with a total of US$6.5 million from Middle East Venture Partners, DASH Ventures, TAMM, RIMCO Investments, Endeavor's Catalyst Fund, and other investors. This investment is expected to help the platform further develop its integrated health solutions, access new markets and enrich medical content in Arabic.

Services 
Altibbi offers users in the MENA region a wide range of medical services including:

 Access to medical articles, written in a simple language to raise awareness among a non-expert audience. 
 Access to daily news and updates. 
 Access to the “Encyclopedia of Medicines”, a comprehensive reference featuring all medicines that are available in the MENA market. 
 Access to the “Medical Glossary”, which explains to non-experts medical terms in a simplified language. 
 Access to medical laboratories. 
 Access to the “Question and Answer” section, which enables users to send their questions and receive answers from specialized doctors for free.
 Access to informative videos on a wide range of health issues. 
 Access to the directory of medical care providers in the MENA region. 
 Consultation services, enabling patients to reach a doctor around the clock in all countries for a fee, which can be paid using different payment methods. 
 Access to e-clinics, a system that enables doctors to handle their patients’ files online through the platform.

Statistics 
Altibbi brings together more than 12 thousand accredited medical doctors from all specializations and different Arab countries. Thanks to their availability on the platform, users can get a remote medical diagnosis (if possible) from providers who facilitate the provision of healthcare services for users around the clock.

In 2017, more than 50 thousand users were registered for phone consultation service with medical doctors. In addition, more than 10 million people visited the website on a monthly basis.

Awards 
In recognition of its efforts as one of the leading creators of medical content in Arabic, Altibbi was awarded the first prize in health category by the Arab E-Content Award in Bahrain in 2013.

The award, which falls under the United Nations’ World Global Summit (WGS), reportedly came after presenting high-quality digital content in Arabic for years.

References

External links 

Arabic-language websites
Medical websites